Eurostile is a geometric sans-serif typeface designed by Aldo Novarese in 1962. Novarese created Eurostile for one of the best-known Italian foundries, Nebiolo, in Turin.

Novarese developed Eurostile to succeed the similar Microgramma, which he had helped design. Microgramma was a titling font with only uppercase letters, which came with a variety of weights. A decade after Microgramma, Novarese resolved this limitation with his design of Eurostile, which added lowercase letters, a bold condensed variant, and an ultra narrow design he called Eurostile Compact, for a total of seven fonts.

Eurostile is a popular font, particularly suitable for headings and signs. Its linear nature suggests modern architecture, with an appeal both technical and functional. The squarish shapes with their rounded corners evoke the appearance of television screens of the 1950s and 1960s.  It is particularly popular in science fiction artwork and media set or produced in the 1960s and 70s, alongside other graphic design use. Eurostile and its antecedent Microgramma had a near-monopoly on science fiction typefaces through the end of the 20th century, before Ray Larabie, seeing an opening in the market, began designing more modern computer fonts for the genre and distributed them through freeware.

Foundry type

Introduced by Nebiolo in 1962.

Cold type copies
The popularity of Eurostile continued strong right into the cold type era, and it was offered by various manufacturers under the following names:

 Aldostyle — Autologic
 Eurogothic — Alphatype
 Eurostyle — Compugraphic
 Gamma — III
 Waltham — Star/Photon

Digital versions

Europe
Europe is a variant of Eurostile designed at TypeMarket in 1992–1993 by Alexey Kustov. The family includes 16 fonts, adding Shadow Demi, Shadow Oblique, and the missing oblique counterparts to the original Linotype family. It supports Cyrillic characters.

Eurostile DisCaps
Eurostile DisCaps is a small caps version of the font. The family comes with one width in regular and bold weights, without obliques.

Eurostile LT
Eurostile LT is a variant of Eurostile by Linotype. It uses squarer designs for non-letter characters like integral, infinity, pilcrow; letterlike symbols like @, the copyright mark, the registration mark; and accents such as cedilla and the tilde. However, the circle in circled letters (@, Ω) remained circular, which was not fixed until Eurostile Next. The asterisk was redesigned to use six points instead of five. Some numerals, such as "1", were redesigned with a straight tail instead of an angled tail for use in Japan.

In all, the family includes 11 fonts, adding an Outline Bold font to the original Eurostile family by Linotype. It supports ISO Adobe 2,Adobe CE, Latin extended character sets.

Eurostile Next (2008)
Eurostile Next is an optically-rescaled and redesigned version of the original font family, designed by Linotype Type Director Akira Kobayashi. The redesign was based on the specimens of the original metal fonts.

Redesigned features include restoring the super curve lost in the previous film and digital versions, reduced stroke weight difference between the upper and lowercase letters, type-sensitive accents and letterlike symbols (ç, É, @, €). In addition, Kobayashi added new Light and Ultra Light weights to complement the Extended, Normal, and Condensed variations within the family, added small caps letters and figures.

The family consists of 15 fonts in 5 weights and 3 widths each. It supports ISO Adobe 2,Adobe CE, Latin extended character sets. OpenType features include small caps, tabular and proportional figures, superior and inferior numerals, diagonal fractions, and ordinals. Kobayashi decided not to provide italics.

Eurostile Candy (2008)
Eurostile Candy is a variant of Eurostile Next with rounded corners. Extra strokes in letters such as a, s, or t, are removed. Joints in letters such as n and r have been simplified to create even more square shapes.

The family consists of three weights (regular, semi bold, bold) in extended width, without oblique fonts. It supports ISO Adobe 2,Adobe CE, Latin extended character sets. Extra OpenType features found in Eurostile Next are not supported.

Eurostile Unicase (2008)
Eurostile Unicase is a variant of Eurostile Next with unicase letters. The family consists of one font (Regular) in extended width, without oblique fonts, but it has heavier weight than Eurostile Next Extended Bold. It supports ISO Adobe 2, Adobe CE, and Latin extended character sets. Extra OpenType features found in Eurostile Next are not supported.

Eurostile Relief
Eurostile Relief is a shadowed version of the font designed by URW Studio.

Eurostile Stencil
Eurostile Stencil is a stencil font based on URW's Eurostile black extended (D), designed by Achaz Reuss.

Square 721
The Square 721 font from Bitstream is very nearly identical to Eurostile albeit with slightly-different proportions. Square 721 is available in 2 weights and 3 widths each.

URW version
In the URW version, there are also Greek, Cyrillic, subscript and superscript, box drawing characters. The family has 16 fonts in five weights and three widths, with condensed fonts on regular and heavy weights; extended fonts on regular and black weights; complementary oblique fonts on black, bold, heavy, heavy condensed, medium, regular, regular condensed.

Variants
Francker is a variant based on Eurostile.

Michroma is a free and open source digital adaptation created by Vernon Adams, based on the extended forms of Eurostile and its predecessor Microgramma. Only one weight was released before Adams suffered injuries in 2014 that were ultimately fatal.

Applications

Television
Eurostile is one of the most popular fonts in science-fiction television. Doctor Who used the font for the credits during the Second Doctor era (1966 to 1969, with Patrick Troughton in the lead role), and again in cast and crew titles from 1987 to 1989. Eurostile—and the Microgramma Extended Bold font on which it is based—was the primary font used in the science fiction series UFO, created by Gerry Anderson in 1969. All of the vehicles and clothing bearing the logo of the series' secret organisation SHADO used the font, in addition to the main titles. 

Eurostile was also used in the title of television shows such as Ironside, Adam-12, Star Trek: Enterprise, Deal or No Deal, The Amazing Race, and Judge Mathis. Eurostile Extended Bold was used in the logo and inter-title sequence of Nickelodeon's Drake & Josh (alongside the regular variant, specifically on the "DRAKE" and "JOSH" scrolling text in the background), and was used in titles and set backdrops for Channel 4's early 90s comedy series Vic Reeves Big Night Out. Type expert Dave Addey noted: "Indeed, Eurostile is such a quick way to establish a timeframe that whenever I see it in real life – which happens quite a lot in my adopted home of California – I assume I’ve been transported to some futuristic dystopia, where a local care center feels more like a sinister government facility for scientific experimentation." Eurostile is also featured in many games on The Price is Right, as well as the logo for the Sunday night newsmagazine 60 Minutes. The 2021 Netflix biography on the American fashion designer Halston uses Eurostile Extended for the main logo and interstitial placements.

Video games
Eurostile can be found in several video games such as Homeworld, Ratchet and Clank, Ridge Racer, Tom Clancy's Ghost Recon, Tekken, Splinter Cell, Driv3r, Elite Dangerous, and the StarCraft series.

Film
Eurostile, particularly Eurostile Bold Extended, is used extensively in science fiction movies, among them 2001: A Space Odyssey (especially for HAL 9000) Jetsons: The Movie,  Moon, Back to the Future, Starship Troopers, and The Andromeda Strain.

Logos
Eurostile is a corporate branding font for Toshiba, Dimension Films, and Diadora. The retail version was authorized by Toshiba Europe GmbH to URW, where Eurostile Black OT was sold. Eurostile Extended Bold is used in the Nokia, New Flyer, Casio and Roland Corporation JUNO logos. The Eurovision Song Contest also used the font from 2004 to 2014. Eurostile is also used for the logo of Rotarex, Colgan Air, Roadcycling.com, and Roadcycling.mobi. Halliburton uses Eurostyle Extended Two for its logo. The NBA's San Antonio Spurs use Eurostile in their logos. In the 1970s and 1980s, Eurostile was the font for the Tandy Corporation. The Daihatsu corporate logo also used the Eurostile font. Dekoron Wire & Cable, LLC uses Eurostile for their company logo.

Currency
Eurostile is used in Canadian Journey series of Canadian dollar bank notes.

Other
Eurostile is used in a lot of PSA Peugeot Citroën vehicles such as Peugeots and most Citroëns.

Dell used Eurostile for its full-screen "Dell End User Software License Agreement" first-run, pre-startup program that was seen on its Inspiron laptops made between 2003-2007, as well a black-colored keyboard (for the Num Lock, Scroll Lock, and Caps Lock indicator labels) from the early 2000s.

Rooster Teeth's Let's Play Minecraft series used Eurostile for its thumbnails on YouTube from 2012 to 2014.

References

External links

URW's Eurostile page
Linotype's Eurostile page: EuroStile, Eurostile LT
Microsoft Typography: Eurostile font family
FontHaus's Eurostile page

Eurostile Next
Eurostile Next Font Family — by Akira Kobayashi
Eurostile Candy Font Family — by Akira Kobayashi
Eurostile Unicase Font Family — by Akira Kobayashi
Eurostile Candy & Eurostile Unicase: Eurostile extras — Akira Kobayashi's Eurostile Candy & Eurostile Unicase

Geometric sans-serif typefaces
Letterpress typefaces
Photocomposition typefaces
Digital typefaces
Monotype typefaces
Typefaces and fonts introduced in 1962
Typefaces designed by Aldo Novarese
Nebiolo typefaces